The New Zealand Derby is a classic event in New Zealand for 3 year old harness horses, run at Addington Raceway.

History

Formerly called the New Brighton Derby Stakes from 1914 to 1925, the race was conducted by the New Brighton Trotting Cub and decided in the Autumn. In 1925, it was taken over by the Metropolitan Trotting Club and decided in the Spring. In 1982 it was switched to the Summer. 

In 1968–1969, the race was 1 miles and in 1970–1972, 1m 5f. In 1973-83 it was a standing start race over 2600 metres.

From 1984, it became a 2600 Metres Mobile race.

Records
Most wins by a driver:
 12 - M F Holmes (1928, 1930, 1931, 1938, 1939, 1942, 1946, 1947, 1954, 1957, 1960, 1972)
 11 - Mark Purdon (1993, 1995, 1996, 1997, 2001, 2002, 2004, 2008, 2013, 2016, 2017)
 4 - J D Litten (1951, 1953, 1955, 1964)

Most wins by an owner:
 4 - H F Nicoll (1921, 1928, 1930, 1931)

Race results 

The past winners of the race are as follows:

Other major races
 Great Northern Derby
 Auckland Trotting Cup
 New Zealand Trotting Cup
 New Zealand Free For All
 Noel J Taylor Mile
 New Zealand Messenger
 Rowe Cup
 Dominion Handicap
 Inter Dominion Pacing Championship
 Inter Dominion Trotting Championship

See also
 Harness racing
 Harness racing in New Zealand

References

Horse races in New Zealand